Birdhaur (sometimes spelled Birdhawar) is a village in Mohammadganj block, in the Palamau district of the Indian state of Jharkhand.

References 

Villages in Palamu district